Kevin Tyrone Eubanks (born November 15, 1957) is an American jazz and fusion guitarist and composer. He was the leader of The Tonight Show Band with host Jay Leno from 1995 to 2010. He also led the Primetime Band on the short lived The Jay Leno Show.

Early life and education 
Eubanks was born into a musical family. His older brother, Robin Eubanks, is a trombonist, and his younger brother Duane Eubanks is a trumpeter. As an elementary school student, Eubanks was trained in violin, trumpet, and piano at the Settlement Music School (in Philadelphia). He later attended Berklee College of Music (in Boston, Massachusetts).

Personal life 
Eubanks is a pescetarian and maintains a diet of fresh fruits, vegetables, grains, egg whites, and fish.

Career 

After Eubanks moved to New York, he began performing with noted jazzmen such as Art Blakey (1980–81), Roy Haynes, Slide Hampton and Sam Rivers. Like his brother Robin, he has played on record with double bassist Dave Holland. 

In 1983, while continuing to perform with others, he formed his own quartet, playing gigs in Jordan, Pakistan, and India on a tour sponsored by the U.S. State Department.

In 2020, Eubanks appeared as a guest on the Studio 60 on the Sunset Strip marathon fundraiser episode of The George Lucas Talk Show. In the fall of 2021, Eubanks returned to working with Leno, as a sidekick on a revival of the TV game show You Bet Your Life.

Recording 
His first recording as a leader, Guitarist, was released on the Elektra label when Eubanks was 25 years old. It led to a seven-album contract with the GRP label and four albums for Blue Note. In total, Eubanks has appeared on over 100 albums. In 2001, he founded the label Insoul Music on which he has released six albums.

Teaching 
Eubanks has taught at the Banff School of Fine Arts in Canada, at Rutgers University, and at the Charlie Parker School in Perugia, Italy. In 2005, Eubanks received an honorary doctorate degree from his alma mater, Berklee College of Music. He has served as an active member of the Artistic Advisory Panel of the BMI Foundation since 1999.

The Tonight Show
In 1992, Eubanks moved to the West Coast to play guitar in The Tonight Show Band. He composed "Kevin's Country," the closing theme music for The Tonight Show with Jay Leno. In 1995, he replaced Branford Marsalis as leader of the band.

When NBC moved Leno's show from late night to prime time, Eubanks moved with the band to continue conducting music for the short-lived The Jay Leno Show. Eubanks appeared on the new show as The Primetime Band.

On April 12, 2010, Eubanks announced on the show that he would be leaving The Tonight Show following its 18th season. His last show was on Friday, May 28, 2010. He indicated in an interview with The Philadelphia Inquirer that he wanted to concentrate on music, adding that his leaving was not provoked by any problems with Leno or NBC. Following his departure from The Tonight Show, he began touring with bandmate Marvin "Smitty" Smith on drums, Bill Pierce on saxophone, and Rene Camacho on bass.

Discography

As leader
 Guitarist (Elektra Musician, 1983)
 Sundance (GRP, 1984)
 Opening Night (GRP, 1985)
 Face to Face (GRP, 1986)
 The Heat of Heat (GRP, 1987)
 Shadow Prophets (GRP, 1988)
 The Searcher (GRP, 1989)
 Promise of Tomorrow (GRP, 1990)
 Turning Point (Blue Note, 1992)
 Spirit Talk (Blue Note, 1993)
 Live at Bradley's (Blue Note, 1994)
 Spirit Talk 2 – Revelations (Blue Note, 1995)
 Zen Food (Mack Avenue, 2010)
 The Messenger (Mack Avenue, 2012)
 Duets with Stanley Jordan (Mack Avenue, 2015) 
 East West Time Line (Mack Avenue, 2017)

As sideman 
 Art Blakey and the Jazz Messengers − Live at Montreux and Northsea (Timeless, 1980)
 Steve Arrington's Hall of Fame − Steve Arrington's Hall Of Fame, Vol.1 (Atlantic, 1983) 	
 The Young Lions (Elektra Musician, 1983)
 Urszula Dudziak − Sorrow Is Not Forever... But Love Is (Keytone, 1983)
 James Williams − Alter Ego (Sunnyside, 1984)
 Oliver Lake Quintet − Expandable Language (Black Saint, 1985)
 Billy Hart − Oshumare (Gramavision, 1985)
 Meredith D'Ambrosio − It's Your Dance (Sunnyside, 1985)
 James Williams Sextet − Progress Report (Sunnyside, 1985)
 The Mike Gibbs Orchestra − Big Music (Venture, 1988)
 Billy Hart − Rah  (Gramavision, 1988)
 Robin Eubanks − Different Perspectives (JMT, 1989) 
 Dave Holland Quartet − Extensions (ECM, 1989)
 Greg Osby − Season of Renewal (JMT, 1990)
 Gary Thomas − While the Gate Is Open (JMT, 1990)
 Gary Thomas − The Kold Kage (JMT, 1991)
 Robin Eubanks − Karma (JMT, 1991) 	 
 Kirk Lightsey Trio − From Kirk to Nat (Criss Cross Jazz, 1991)
 Steve Coleman − Rhythm in Mind (Novus, 1992)
 Harold Mabern – The Leading Man (DIW, 1993)
 Ralph Moore – Round Trip (Reservoir, 1985 [1987])
 Jean-Luc Ponty − No Absolute Time (Atlantic, 1993)
 Adam Rudolph's Moving Pictures − Skyway (Soul Note, 1994)
 Dianne Reeves − That Day (Blue Note, 1997)
 Terri Lyne Carrington − Jazz Is a Spirit (ACT, 2002) 
 Carmen Lundy − Moment to Moment (Afrasia, 2007)
 Dave Holland − Prism (Okeh/Dare2, 2013)
 Orrin Evans – #knowingishalfthebattle (Smoke Sessions, 2017)
 Dave Holland – Another Land (Edition Records Ltd, 2021)

See also

Jazz Bridge

References

External links
Official Website

Kevin Eubanks Acoustic on YouTube
Kevin Eubanks' Vegetarianism
 

1957 births
20th-century American guitarists
African-American jazz guitarists
African-American television personalities
American bandleaders
American expatriates in Canada
American expatriates in Italy
American male guitarists
American television personalities
Male television personalities
Berklee College of Music alumni
Guitarists from Philadelphia
Lead guitarists
Living people
Smooth jazz guitarists
Jazz musicians from Pennsylvania
20th-century American male musicians
American male jazz musicians
Mack Avenue Records artists
20th-century African-American musicians
21st-century African-American people